The American (North and South America) horned owls and the Old World eagle-owls make up the genus Bubo, at least as traditionally described. The genus name Bubo is Latin for owl.

This genus contains 10 species that are found in many parts of the world. Some of the largest living Strigiformes are in Bubo. Traditionally, only owls with ear-tufts were included in this genus, but that is no longer the case.

Taxonomy

The genus Bubo was introduced in 1805 by the French zoologist André Duméril for the horned owls. The type species is the Eurasian eagle-owl. The word bubo is Latin for the Eurasian eagle owl and was used as the specific epithet for the species by Carl Linnaeus in 1758.

A molecular phylogenetic study published in 2020 found that species in the genera Scotopelia and Ketupa were embedded within the clade containing members of the genus Bubo making the genus Bubo  paraphyletic. To create monophyletic genera nine species were moved for Bubo to Ketupa.

Species
The genus contains 10 extant species:
 Snowy owl, Bubo scandiacus
 Great horned owl, Bubo virginianus
 Lesser horned owl, Bubo magellanicus
 Eurasian eagle-owl, Bubo bubo
 Indian eagle-owl, Bubo bengalensis
 Pharaoh eagle-owl, Bubo ascalaphus
 Cape eagle-owl, Bubo capensis
 Arabian eagle-owl, Bubo milesi
 Greyish eagle-owl, Bubo cinerascens
 Spotted eagle-owl, Bubo africanus

Sometimes included in this genus:
 Verreaux's Eagle-owl, Ketupa lactea
 Spot-bellied Eagle-owl, Ketupa nipalensis
 Barred Eagle-owl,Ketupa sumatrana
 Fraser's Eagle-owl,Ketupa poensis
 Akun eagle-owl, Ketupa leucosticta 
 Philippine eagle-owl, Ketupa philippensis
 Dusky eagle-owl, Ketupa coromanda
 Shelley's eagle-owl, Ketupa shelleyi
 Blakiston's fish owl, Ketupa blakistoni
 Brown fish owl, Ketupa zeylonensis
 Tawny fish owl, Ketupa flavipes
 Buffy fish owl, Ketupa ketupu
 Pel's fishing owl, Scotopelia peli
 Rufous fishing owl, Scotopelia ussheri
 Vermiculated fishing owl, Scotopelia bouvieri

Fossil record
Named and distinct Bubo species are:
 Bubo florianae (Late Miocene of Csákvár, Hungary, tentatively placed here)
 Bubo leakeyae (Early Pleistocene of Tanzania)
 Bubo binagadensis (Late Pleistocene of Binagady, Azerbaijan)
 Bubo osvaldoi (Pleistocene of Cuba)
 Bubo insularis (Pleistocene of Sardinia)

Some notable undescribed fossils of prehistoric horned owls, usually quite fragmentary remains, have also been recorded:
 Bubo sp. (Late Pliocene of Senèze, France)
 Bubo sp. (Late Pliocene of Rębielice Królewskie, Poland; tentatively placed here)
 Bubo sp. (Late Pleistocene of San Josecito Cavern, Mexico)

Specimen UMMP V31030, a Late Pliocene coracoid from the Rexroad Formation of Kansas (USA), cannot be conclusively assigned to either Bubo or Strix. This fossil is from a taxon similar in size to the great horned owl (B. virginianus) or the great grey owl (S. nebulosa).

The Sinclair owl (Bubo sinclairi) from Late Pleistocene California may have been a paleosubspecies of the great horned owl, while the roughly contemporary Bubo insularis of the central and eastern Mediterranean has been considered a junior synonym of a brown fish owl paleosubspecies. Additional paleosubspecies are discussed on the appropriate species page.

Several presumed Bubo fossils have turned out to be from different birds. The Late Eocene/Early Oligocene eared owls "Bubo" incertus and "Bubo" arvernensis are now placed in the fossil barn-owl genera Nocturnavis and Necrobyas, respectively. "Bubo" leptosteus is now recognized as primitive owl in the genus Minerva (formerly Protostrix). "Bubo" poirreiri from the Late Oligocene or Early Miocene of Saint-Gérard-le-Puy in France, is now placed in Mioglaux.

On the other hand, the supposed fossil heron "Ardea" lignitum from the Late Pliocene of Plaue-Rippersroda (Germany) was apparently an owl and close to Bubo or more probably actually belongs here. Given its age – about 2 million years ago or so – it is usually included in the Eurasian eagle-owl today.

Interactions with humans
Because of their nocturnal habits, most owls do not directly interact with humans. However, in 2015, an eagle owl in Purmerend, Netherlands, attacked some fifty people before it was caught by a hired falconer.

Footnotes

References
 
 
 König, Claus; Weick, Friedhelm & Becking, Jan-Hendrik (1999): Owls: A guide to the owls of the world. Yale University Press, New Haven. 
 Lambrecht, Kálmán (1933): Handbuch der Palaeornithologie [Handbook of Paleornithology]. Gebrüder Bornträger, Berlin. [in German]
 Mlíkovský, Jiří (2002): Cenozoic Birds of the World, Part 1: Europe. Ninox Press, Prague.
 
 
 Olson, Storrs L. (1985): The fossil record of birds. In: Farner, D.S.; King, J.R. & Parkes, Kenneth C. (eds.): Avian Biology 8: 79–238. Academic Press, New York.

External links
 

 
Taxa named by André Marie Constant Duméril